Chiyoarashi Yoshinobu (born July 12, 1991 as Watanabe Yoshinobu) is a Japanese professional sumo wrestler from Chiba Prefecture who wrestles for Kokonoe stable. He debuted in March 2007, and reached his highest rank of jūryō 10 in November 2011.

Early life and entry into sumo 
Born in Kisarazu, Chiyoarashi began sumo training with his father beginning in elementary school. In his third grade of elementary school he met former Chiyonofuji, the then oyakata of Kokonoe stable. He then joined Kokonoe stable at the age of 15.

Career 
Debuting in March 2007, Chiyoarashi reached the salaried jūryō division in September 2011. He was promoted alongside his Kokonoe stablemate . His first tournament in the division he posted an 8-7 score which saw him promoted to his career highest rank of Jūryō 10 in November 2011, but he failed to complete the tournament due to injury and posted a losing score of 4-6-5. He then sat out the next tournament in January 2012 and when he returned in March of that year he was in the lower ranks of makushita. 

He once again returned to jūryō in May of 2013 at Jūryō 12 where he posted a score of 7-8. In the next tournament in July 2013, he was ranked at Jūryō 13, however, once again due to injury he had to pull out in the last day ending the tournament with a record of 4-10-1. He was forced to sit out three tournaments from November 2013 to January 2014, whereupon his return he was in sandanme. 

In March 2014 he won his first yūshō in Sandanme with a perfect record of 7-0. By May 2015 he was in the upper ranks of Makushita but again was injured and had to pull out of the tournament and he sat out three tournaments from July 2015 to November 2016. He returned in January 2016 at the rank of Jonidan 32 and lost the yusho in a playoff to Kaito.

Between January 2017 and 2021, he wrestled consistently in the Makushita division, sitting out only one tournament in January 2021 due to a Covid-19 outbreak in his stable. The Japan Sumo Association announced after the November 2021 tournament that Chiyoarashi had been promoted back to jūryō, after an absence of 49 tournaments or eight and a half years. This is the longest time taken by a wrestler to return to jūryō in sumo history. He scored six wins against nine losses in his return to jūryō, and fell back to makushita after just one tournament. However, a 4–3 score at Makushita 1 East in March 2022 saw him promoted to jūryō again.

Fighting style 
Chiyoarashi is an oshi-style wrestler with his primary kimarite being oshidashi.

Career record

See also
List of active sumo wrestlers

References

External link

1991 births
Living people
Japanese sumo wrestlers
Sumo people from Chiba Prefecture
People from Kisarazu